Davey Holmes (born October 4, 1969 in Massachusetts) is an American screenwriter, producer and director. He is the creator and executive producer of the television show Get Shorty on Epix.

Career
Holmes began his writing career in New York City with a production of his original play More Lies About Jerzy (2001) at the Vineyard Theatre starring Jared Harris, and later productions of the play in London at the New End Theatre and in Los Angeles at the Hayworth Theatre. See reviews for all productions. More Lies About Jerzy is published by Broadway Play Publishing Inc.

Holmes also works extensively in television. He was Executive Producer of Shameless (Showtime).  Other shows he has written for include In Treatment (HBO) for which he won a Writers Guild of America Award for Best Screenplay - New Series, Damages (FX) for which he received a nomination for Writers Guild of America Award for Best Screenplay - New Series, Pushing Daisies (ABC), Awake,  (NBC), Chicago Code,  (FOX) 3 lbs (CBS) and Law & Order (NBC).

In 2017, Holmes created the Epix television series Get Shorty inspired by the novel of the same name by Elmore Leonard. He also directed episodes. His Holmes Quality Yarns company struck an overall deal with MGM in 2017.

Personal life
Holmes married actress Sonya Walger in July 2009. They currently reside in Los Angeles, California.

Holmes played keyboards with the popular ska punk band, The Mighty Mighty Bosstones, including on their 1989 album, Devil's Night Out.

References

External links

Writers Guild Awards 2009
New York Times interview with Davey Holmes, Jan. 14, 2001
TV Squad: In Treatment writer bringing Worthy new political drama to FOX

1969 births
Living people
Showrunners
American television writers
American male screenwriters
20th-century American dramatists and playwrights
People from Massachusetts
Writers from Los Angeles
American male dramatists and playwrights
20th-century American male writers
21st-century American male writers
Brookline High School alumni
Screenwriters from California